Kentucky Route 750 (KY 750) is a  east–west state highway located within Greenup County.

Route description
The western terminus of the route is at Kentucky Route 3105 (old U.S. Route 23 or US 23) in Raceland, where KY 750 continues north as KY 244. The eastern terminus is at US 23 in Russell. KY 750 is routed over Pond Run Road and Raceland Avenue in Raceland, Lexington Avenue and Powell Lane in Flatwoods and Seaton Avenue and Kenwood Drive in Russell. It is an alternate to the proposed Tri-State Freeway.

History
KY 750 is mostly a two-lane route that connects Raceland and Russell via Flatwoods. It was widened to three lanes for a little under one mile (1.6 km) in Raceland in 2005. Before reconstruction, it was notorious for its narrow width, where buses and automobiles frequently had to drive on the sidewalk to prevent from colliding with another vehicle.

Major intersections

References

External links

 

0750
Transportation in Greenup County, Kentucky